Ibrahim Meité is the name of:

Ibrahim Meite (footballer), English footballer
Ibrahim Meité (sprinter), Ivorian sprinter